Picket may refer to:

 Snow picket, a climbing tool
 Picket fence, a type of fence
 Screw picket, a tethering device
 Picket line, to tether horses
"Picket line" is also used in picketing, a form of protest
See also: "Crossing the picket line"
 Picket (military), a soldier or small unit placed ahead of the main formation
 Radar picket, a radar equipped vehicle on picket duty
 Picket boat, a small military boat
 Picket (punishment), a 16th and 17th century military punishment
 Picket, a fairy chess piece
 The Flying Pickets, a British a cappella vocal group
 Picket (climbing)

Places 
 Picket Hill
 Picket Piece
 Picket Post, a road junction and service area in the New Forest National Park
 Picket Range, a small, extremely rugged subrange of the North Cascades
 Picket Seamount
 Picket Twenty

See also
 Picket fence (disambiguation)
 Pickett (disambiguation)
 Picquet (disambiguation), an alternative spelling for picket but usually only in an historical context 
 Piquet (disambiguation), like picquet another alternative spelling now usually reserved for the game
 Piquette (disambiguation)